Krylovo is a rural locality (a settlement) in Pravdinsk Urban Okrug, Pravdinsky District, Kaliningrad Oblast, Russia. Population:

History
The first written mention of what is now Krylovo was placed in the Chronica nova Prutenica ("New Prussian Chronicle") by Wigand of Marburg (completed around 1394) in connection with the raid of pagan Lithuanians, which took place in 1366. In the 15th-century. here, in the historic region of Bartia, a small castle of the Teutonic Order was built; later the colonists were settled here.

The foundation of the town of Nordenburg is usually regarded as 1405. On 24 July 1407, the community received Kulm law privileges from the Order's Hochmeister Ulrich von Jungingen.

After the Second World War, the village became part of the Gerdauensky District. On 5 July 1950, Nordenburg was renamed Krylovo. Since December 1962, the village has become part of the Pravdinsky District.

Administrative and municipal status
Within the framework of municipal divisions, since 5 May 2015, the territories of the town of district significance of Pravdinsk, including Krylovo, the urban-type settlement of district significance of Zheleznodorozhny, and of two rural okrugs of Pravdinsky District are incorporated as Pravdinsky Urban Okrug. Before that, the town of district significance was incorporated within Pravdinsky Municipal District as Pravdinskoye Urban Settlement.

Transport
Regional road 27A-028 (ex A 196) coming from Kaliningrad and regional road 27A-042 (ex A 197) coming from Bolshakovo via Chernyakhovsk meet in Krylovo and end at the border with Poland.

Before 1945, Nordenburg was a railway station on the Königsberg (Prussia) (Kaliningrad)–Löwenhagen (Komsomolsk)–Gerdauen (Schelesnodoroschny)–Angerburg (Węgorzewo) railway. In addition, two small railway lines ended in Nordenburg: the line (Insterburg (Tschernjachowsk)–) Warnaschel (1938–1945 Warnheide)–Nordenburg of the Insterburg small railways and the line (Rastenburg (Kętrzyn)–) Barten (Barciany)–Nordenburg of the Rastenburg small railways. Rail transport no longer exists in Krylovo.

The water tower at the train station was renovated in 2020.

Notes

References 

Rural localities in Kaliningrad Oblast